"Cigarette Daydreams" is a song by American alternative rock band Cage the Elephant. Produced by Jay Joyce, it was released as the third single from the band's third studio album Melophobia on August 26, 2014. It topped the Billboard Alternative Songs chart in the United States, becoming the second number-one single from Melophobia, following the album's single "Come a Little Closer", and the band's fifth overall chart-topper.

Writing
Singer Matt Shultz has stated that the song is inspired by a "Personal experience" and that the words came to him naturally. After he began writing Shultz phoned the album's producer who stated "Matt, finish the song right now! Just do it." Shultz also noted that the song came from a desire "to be transparent and speak from naked honesty"

Music video
The official music video for "Cigarette Daydreams" was directed by Mark Pellington and released on September 5, 2014. The video stars actress Juliette Buchs – who is also the former wife of Cage the Elephant frontman Matthew Shultz – as a woman struggling to find peace in her life, interspersed with various scenes of her running away from an unknown entity.

Charts

Weekly charts

Year-end charts

Certifications

Release history

References

External links
 

Songs about tobacco
2013 songs
2014 singles
Cage the Elephant songs
RCA Records singles
Music videos directed by Mark Pellington
Song recordings produced by Jay Joyce
Songs written by Matt Shultz (singer)